Fire Dynamics Simulator (FDS) is a computational fluid dynamics (CFD) model of fire-driven fluid flow. The computer program solves numerically a large eddy simulation form of the Navier–Stokes equations appropriate for low-speed, thermally-driven flow, with an emphasis on smoke and heat transport from fires, to describe the evolution of fire.

FDS is free software developed by the National Institute of Standards and Technology (NIST) of the United States Department of Commerce, in cooperation with VTT Technical Research Centre of Finland. Smokeview is the companion visualization program that can be used to display the output of FDS.

The first version of FDS was publicly released in February 2000. To date, about half of the applications of the model have been for design of smoke handling systems and sprinkler/detector activation studies. The other half consist of residential and industrial fire reconstructions. Throughout its development, FDS has been aimed at solving practical fire problems in fire protection engineering, while at the same time providing a tool to study fundamental fire dynamics and combustion.

The Wildland-Urban Fire Dynamics Simulator (WFDS) is an extension developed by the US Forest Service that is integrated into FDS and allows it to be used for wildfire modeling. It models vegetative fuel either by explicitly defining the volume of the vegetation or, for surface fuels such as grass, by assuming uniform fuel at the air-ground boundary.

FDS is a Fortran program that reads input parameters from a text file, computes a numerical solution to the governing equations, and writes user-specified output data to files. Smokeview is a companion program that reads FDS output files and produces animations on the computer screen. Smokeview has a simple menu-driven interface, while FDS does not. However, there are various third-party programs that have been developed to generate the text file containing the input parameters needed by FDS.

See also
 Wildfire modeling

References

External links
 FDS Official website
 Google Discussion Group for Fire Dynamics Simulator and Smokeview
 Wikibooks tutorial
 FDS+Evac Tools
 FDS Project Road Map
 AutoCAD plugin to convert 3D geometry to FDS format
 PyroSim, a graphical interface (GUI) for creation of FDS input files. (commercial)
 
 

Firefighting
Fire prevention
Fire protection
Wildfires